Cross Culture may refer to:

 Over Ashes, formerly Cross Culture, an American Christian rock band
 Cross Culture (album), an album by Joe Lovano